The following is a list of events, births, and deaths in 1933 in Switzerland.

Incumbents
Federal Council:
Giuseppe Motta
Edmund Schulthess (President)
Jean-Marie Musy
Heinrich Häberlin
Marcel Pilet-Golaz
Albert Meyer
Rudolf Minger

Tournaments
1932–33 Nationalliga
1933–34 Nationalliga

Establishments
Schurter (incorporated 1949)
Giro del Mendrisiotto, a Swiss bike race, is started
Tour de Suisse, a Swiss bike race, is started
Integra-Signum, a Swiss train protection system, is introduced

Events

Other
Berne Trial is in progress until 1935

Births
January 6 - Emil Steinberger, comedian, director and writer
January 28 - Fred Mayer, photographer

February
February 27 - Livio Vacchini, architect (d. April 2, 2007)
March 14 - René Felber, politician 
March 27 - Oskar von Büren, cyclist 
June 11 - Harald Szeemann, curator and art historian (died February 18, 2005)
June 18 - Heinrich von Stietencron, German indologist (died 2018)
June 22 - André Grobéty, footballer 
June 22 - Peter Brogle, actor (died March 27, 2006)
July 13 - Henri Lauener, philosopher (d. October 28, 2002)
July 25 - Elwyn Friedrich, ice hockey player (d. February 2, 2012)
August 14 - Richard R. Ernst, physical chemist and Nobel Laureate
August 29 - Arnold Koller, politician
September 8 - Marcel Vonlanthen, football (association football) forward
October 25 - René Brodmann, football (association football) defender
December 18 - Rene Haller, naturalist
Elisabeth Nagele, luger

Deaths
April 28 - Hermann Sahli, internist
Victor Sterki, malacologist

References

 
Switzerland
Years of the 20th century in Switzerland